This is a list of characters in the animated TV show Tutenstein.

Main
Tut Ankh En Set Amun ("Tutenstein") - (voiced by Jeannie Elias (seasons 1–2) and Donna Cherry (season 3 and movie)) A very impulsive but kindhearted young mummy. His nickname, Tutenstein, is a play on words on Frankenstein, often shortened to Tut. Once Tut lived a lazy but, sadly, very short life as an Egyptian Pharaoh. He died because back in Ancient Egypt he selflessly saved his old friend Nebka from being smashed by rocks from a temple that was collapsing, so he himself was crushed to death. He couldn't remember that at the first place, but he found out at the Movie "Clash of the Pharaohs" with a time travel. Tutenstein died at the age of 10, accidentally reawakened about 3,000 years later by Cleo, so his age in the current time is 3,010 years. He is the owner of the 'Scepter of Was' and often has trouble with many gods or ancient scripts, mostly out of boredom or plain unsuspectingness about the modern world. Even when his intentions are good and he for example tries to help Cleo, with one of her "teenage problems", his pretty careless way to use magic is getting him into dangerous situations on regular base. But in such situations his cleverness and courage come to the fore and he's always doing his very best to make things right again, not hesitating to risk his Afterlife to save everyone. Apart from that, Tut spends most of his free time in his sarcophagus because he must hide from the museum visitors every day, which is really boring and uneasy for him. He is a very extroverted character, caring but brutally honest, often misunderstood as being 'rude'. But well, Tut just has a very 'direct' way to speak his mind and when arguing with Cleo his sarcastic side is coming through. But even with that snarky attitude and special kind of 'royal' humour of his, Tut has a golden heart. He loves to play Senet. And he is addicted to sweets, especially ice cream, or 'creamed ice' like he calls it.
Cleo Carter - (voiced by (Crystal Scales) (series), Leah Lynette (movie)) A 12-year-old African American girl who wants to become an Egyptologist, because her father, who has gone missing at an exploration tour, was also one. After chasing her cat, Luxor, she accidentally brought Tut back to life. She is opinionated and tends to argue with Tut, complaining about his impulsiveness and outspokenness, but she always does it in a very rude and unceremonious way, which leads to a big fight between them regularly. Although she actually doesn't feel like it, she is often forced to help Tut set things right, but she would prefer Tut to stay nice and quiet in his sarcophagus all the time, because she is afraid someone would find out about him being a living mummy and she as teenage girl has got "better things to do than watching over a mummy boy constantly", as she uses to say. Most of the time it's very obvious that she does not really want to spend time with Tut. She would rather go skateboarding or hang out with her friends. Many times she is making clear that she's "sick of babysitting him" all the time. Typically, she tries to stop Tutenstein doing something wrong or rash but because of her impudence and incomplete explanations, he pays no attention to it. She always has her pocket computer, letting her gain instant access to facts about Egypt. Cleo looks like her mom, but she misses her dad very much. Her favorite color is pink although she doesn't really look good in it.
Luxor - (voiced by David Lodge) Cleo's anthropomorphic pet cat and was possibly named after the Luxor Temple. When Tut was brought back to life, he was compelled to be ever loyal to his new "master" and has gained the ability to talk. Luxor is often the voice of reason for Tut. He can be gullible at times.

Humans
Walter Jacobs (voiced by Joey Simmrin) - The easily frightened, friendly yet dimwitted, young security guard at the museum.
Professor Horace Behdety (voiced by Lex Lang) - A haughty professor and the cranky director of the museum. Throughout the series, he's shown to be self-centered and fiercely proud of the Egyptian display at the museum, and there are hints that Horace is also possibly the archeologist who discovered Tutankhensetamun's tomb.
Dr. Roxanne Vanderwheele (voiced by Jeannie Elias) - The Professor's colleague, a bright young scholar and thoroughly modern archaeologist.
Rosalie Rivara (voiced by Candi Milo) - Rosalie Rivara is a vain, publicity hungry TV news reporter.
Natasha (voiced by  Marie Vencer) - Cleo's best friend with a bad habit of lying and she doesn't appear to be very bright.
Kyle  (voiced by Debi Derryberry) - One of Cleo's friends and has a crush on Natasha.
Jake (voiced by Billy West) - One of Cleo's friends and her secret crush.
Iris Carter (voiced by Louella Narcisus) - Cleo's mother and a construction engineer.
Cleo's Father (voiced by Dave Fennoy) - A well experienced Egyptologist/Archeologist. There are brief scenes shown throughout the series that Cleo's father is probably alive but trapped in an unknown location.
Thomas -  (voiced by Crystal Scales) - Cleo's 5 year old cousin.
Nubkar (voiced by Jason Marsden) - Tut's best friend from ancient times who is becoming - with Tut's help - released from the destiny of being a restless ghost in the underworld.
Buzz and Shakey (voiced by Kate Higgins and Cindy Robinson) - Two young teen delinquents Tut befriended for a short while, 'cause he is impressed by their questionable actions short-termed .
Katie (voiced by Kate Higgins) - Cleo's childhood enemy and briefly became a rival for Jake's attention.

Others
Set (voiced by David Lodge) - The Egyptian god of chaos, destruction, and disorder, and the main antagonist of the series. For thousands of years, Set has been condemned to the darkest pit of the Egyptian underworld. He is the Egyptian mythical counterpart of Satan.
The Demons of the Underworld - They often play a large role in the show. They are two giant demons in the underworld, Wenamoo and Nahahair (voiced by Jess Harnell and Lex Lang).
The Egyptian Gods - The almighty and responsible gods of ancient Egypt are often overseers of all the events of the immortal world and the underworld. The list includes Osiris (voiced by Daran Norris), Isis (voiced by Cindy Robinson), Ra (voiced by David Lodge), Horus (voiced by Jess Harnell), Anubis (voiced by Lex Lang), Bastet (voiced by Wendee Lee), Thoth (voiced by Michael Bell), Maat (voiced by Wendee Lee), Nut (voiced by Michelle Ruff), Geb (voiced by Javus Van Dervort)  and many others.
Hassan El Zabkar (voiced by Michael Bell) - An old Egyptian American man who summoned Ammut.
Ammut (voiced by Wendee Lee) - One of the evil Gods of the underworld.
Apep (voiced by Cam Clarke) - Ra's nemesis who joins forces with Set.

Deities
 Seth
 Ammut
 Bennu
 Hathor
 Sekhmet
 Khnum 
 Mut 
 Ra
 Bes
 Hemsut 
 Isis
 Geb
 Ptah
 Sobek 
 Wadjet 
 Anubis
 Thoth

Notes and references

Tutenstein